George Miranda dos Santos (born 24 June 1977), known as Binho, is a Brazilian former footballer who last played as a midfielder.

In June 2007 he was signed by Iraklis F.C. but he was released on free in January's transfer window.

Honours
Vitória Setúbal
Taça de Portugal: 2004–05

External links

 lpfp.pt
 Brazilian FA archive

1977 births
Living people
Sportspeople from Bahia
Association football midfielders
Brazilian footballers
Sport Club Corinthians Alagoano players
Vitória F.C. players
Iraklis Thessaloniki F.C. players
Petrochimi Tabriz F.C. players
Primeira Liga players
Super League Greece players
Azadegan League players
Brazilian expatriate footballers
Brazilian expatriate sportspeople in Portugal
Brazilian expatriate sportspeople in Greece
Brazilian expatriate sportspeople in Iran
Expatriate footballers in Portugal
Expatriate footballers in Greece
Expatriate footballers in Iran